Halgerda brunneomaculata is a species of sea slug, a dorid nudibranch, shell-less marine gastropod mollusks in the family Discodorididae.

Distribution
This species was described from Guam, Mariana Islands. It has subsequently been reported from Rarotonga in the Cook Islands and the Coral Sea.

References

Discodorididae
Gastropods described in 1993